Kelechi Francis Ibekwe (born 5 April 1984) is a Nigerian football forward who currently plays for S.S. Calcio Giugliano  in the Eccellenza.

References

External links
http://magicovenezia.wordpress.com/2008/07/28/tornano-ibekwe-e-bono-se-ne-va-mattielig/

1984 births
Living people
Nigerian footballers
Nigerian expatriate footballers
Nigeria international footballers
Serie B players
Venezia F.C. players
A.S.D. Portogruaro players
Expatriate footballers in Italy
Association football forwards